Domrud-e Amir-e Olya (also Romanized as Domrūd-e Amīr-e ‘Olyā) is a village in Afrineh Rural District, Mamulan District, Pol-e Dokhtar County, Lorestan Province, Iran. At the 2006 census, its population was 72, in 16 families.

References 

Towns and villages in Pol-e Dokhtar County